Arctobyrrhus is a genus of pill beetles in the family Byrrhidae. There are at least two described species in Arctobyrrhus.

Species
These two species belong to the genus Arctobyrrhus:
 Arctobyrrhus dovrensis Münster, 1902
 Arctobyrrhus subcanus (LeConte, 1878)

References

Further reading

External links

 

Byrrhidae
Articles created by Qbugbot